Rhodanobacter ginsenosidimutans is a  Gram-negative, aerobic, rod-shaped, non-spore-forming and non-motile bacterium from the genus of Rhodanobacter which has been isolated from soil from a ginseng field from Pocheon in Korea.

References

Xanthomonadales
Bacteria described in 2009